The St. Joseph Catholic Church in Hardin, Montana, located at 710 N. Custer Ave., is a Late Gothic Revival-style church built in 1919.  It was built by contractor J.W. Russell.  It was listed on the National Register of Historic Places in 1991.

The church was deemed an "excellent example of Gothic Revival ecclesiastical architecture on a scale suited to a small, western rural town."  It has a generally vertical character.  Gothic Revival elements of its design include its steep roofs, its tall central portico rising to a steeple, and its tall Gothic-shaped windows with tracery and transoms.

References

External links

Churches on the National Register of Historic Places in Montana
Late Gothic Revival architecture
Gothic Revival architecture in Montana
Roman Catholic churches completed in 1919
National Register of Historic Places in Big Horn County, Montana
1919 establishments in Montana
Roman Catholic churches in Montana